The Cartier Champion Two-year-old Filly is an award in European horse racing, founded in 1991, and sponsored by Cartier SA as part of the Cartier Racing Awards. The award winner is decided by points earned in group races plus the votes cast by British racing journalists and readers of the Racing Post and The Daily Telegraph newspapers.

Records
Leading trainer (5 wins):
 Aidan O'Brien – Rumplestiltskin (2005), Misty for Me (2010), Maybe (2011), Minding (2015), Happily (2017)

Leading owner (5 wins):
 Sue Magnier – Rumplestiltskin (2005), Misty for Me (2010), Maybe (2011), Minding (2015), Happily (2017)
 Michael Tabor – Rumplestiltskin (2005), Misty for Me (2010), Maybe (2011), Minding (2015), Happily (2017)

Winners

References

Horse racing awards